Graham Robert Cowdrey (27 June 1964 – 10 November 2020) was an English cricketer.

Biography
Cowdrey was the third son of cricketer and life peer Colin Cowdrey, Baron Cowdrey of Tonbridge and his first wife Penny Chiesman. He was born in Farnborough in 1964 and educated at Wellesley House and Tonbridge School. After one year as a student at Hatfield College, Durham, Cowdrey chose to embark on a professional career.

He played for Kent County Cricket Club as an attacking batsman in first-class and List A cricket from 1984 to 1998.  In his 450 appearances for Kent, he scored over 14000 runs, with his best seasons in 1995 when he helped Kent reach the Benson & Hedges Cup final and win the Sunday League with a List A average of 53.90.

He had two sons, Michael and Alexander, and a daughter, Grace. His nickname of "Van" came from Van Morrison, his favourite musician.

Cowdrey worked as a Cricket Liaison Officer for the England and Wales Cricket Board.

Death
Cowdrey died on 10 November 2020, aged 56, after a short illness.

References

External links

1964 births
2020 deaths
Deaths from sepsis 
English cricketers
Kent cricketers
Alumni of Hatfield College, Durham 
Cricketers from Greater London 
People educated at Tonbridge School
People from Farnborough, London 
Sons of life peers